The Central Arkansas Bears football program is the intercollegiate American football team for University of Central Arkansas (UCA) located in the U.S. state of Arkansas. The team competes in the NCAA Division I Football Championship Subdivision (FCS) as a member of the ASUN Conference, which will play its first football season in 2022. For the 2021 season, UCA was a de facto associate member of the Western Athletic Conference (WAC). Central Arkansas's first football team was fielded in 1908. The team plays its home games at the 12,000-seat Estes Stadium in Conway, Arkansas. The Bears are coached by Nathan Brown, in his fifth year.

UCA left the Southland Conference, which had been its all-sports home since 2006 and its football home since 2007, for the ASUN Conference in July 2021. At the time, the ASUN did not sponsor football, but committed to launching an FCS football league in the near future. Before the 2022 establishment of the ASUN football league, UCA competed in a football partnership between the ASUN and WAC officially branded as the "ASUN–WAC Challenge".

History
The Central Arkansas Bears were formed in 1901 by William Hawkins. Although they finished 1-4-3 in their first season, and have an unusual record of 23-54-22 in its first 20 years of existence, the Bears would play for 7 championships in that span.

UCA would enjoy its greatest success over a 14-year period from 1979 to 1992, when the Bears won or shared 13 of the 14 conference championships, as members of the Arkansas Intercollegiate Conference (AIC). The AIC included in-state schools such as Arkansas Tech, Harding University, Henderson State University, Ouachita Baptist, Southern Arkansas University, University of Arkansas at Monticello, and University of Arkansas at Pine Bluff. During that time frame, UCA won or shared twelve consecutive AIC titles from 1981 - 1992, as well as three NAIA national championships, in 1984, 1985, and 1991. The Bears were a constant presence in the NAIA Top 20, and made the playoffs 12 out of 14 seasons.

In 1993, the Bears left the AIC and the NAIA, and moved up in competition to the NCAA Division II Gulf South Conference. Central Arkansas would stay in the West Division of the GSC through the 2006 season, winning the GSC title in 2005. UCA moved up yet again, in 2007, joining the Southland Conference who are a member of the NCAA Division I-AA.  The Bears have since won four Southland championships in 2008, 2012, 2017 and 2019. Central Arkansas also made the playoffs in 2011, 2012, 2016, 2017 and 2019 (where they earned their first national seed in the playoffs at #8) winning their first FCS playoff game in 2011 over Tennessee Tech.  The Bears also defeated Illinois State in 2016 before losing the next round at Eastern Washington University.

In 2021, UCA accepted an invitation to join the ASUN Conference, ending their membership with the Southland on June 30th, 2021. The first year of ASUN conference football will be a partnership between the ASUN and the revived football league of the Western Athletic Conference (WAC), called the ASUN–WAC Challenge. After the ASUN's first year, more new members are scheduled to join, and a full slate of ASUN-only conference games will be scheduled, beginning in 2022. The ASUN and WAC are petitioning the NCAA for a one-time waiver to automatically send the alliance's champion to the 2021 FCS Playoffs (members will be eligible for at-large berths in any event).

Notable former players
Notable alumni include:
 Nathan Brown
 Dave Burnette
 Monte Coleman
 Tyree Davis
 Willie Davis
 Jacob Ford
 Mike Norvell
 Tremon Smith
 Charlie Strong
 George Odum
 Jonathan Woodard

Championships

National championships

Conference championships

† Co-champions

Playoff appearances

NCAA Division I-AA/FCS
The Bears have appeared in the FCS playoffs five times with an overall record of 2–5.

NCAA Division II
The Bears have appeared in the Division II playoffs two times with an overall record of 2–2.

NAIA
The Bears have appeared in the NAIA playoffs 12 times with an overall record of 12–9–2. They are three time NAIA National Champions (1984, 1985, 1991), with 1984 and 1985 being Co–Champions after ending in a tie in the National Championship Game.

Rivalries

McNeese State

The two teams have met 13 times on the football field with UCA leading the series, 7–6.  Due to conference scheduling requirements, the most recent game was played in 2019.

Arkansas Tech
The Bears also had a long time rivalry with Arkansas Tech University, located in Russellville, Arkansas, only 45 miles west of Conway along Interstate 40, but that series was discontinued after UCA left the Gulf South Conference, and moved up in competition to the Southland Conference.

References

External links
 

 
American football teams established in 1908
1908 establishments in Arkansas